Although there are no definitive box office figures for Nepalese cinema, the following list of highest-grossing films in Nepal is based on figures provided by producers, distributors and some news portals, for prominent films since 2070 BS (2013 CE).

The Nepalese film industry is relatively young. Many early films were produced by the Royal Nepal Film Corporation ( 1971) for the government, which was more concerned with the country's cultural heritage than commercial success. These gradually built a film industry infrastructure and enabled private productions. Kusume Rumal (1985) held the box-office record until this was surpassed in 2001 by the musical Darpan Chaya (these films would contend for the current box office record if figures were adjusted for inflation). New records were set in 2012 with the critically acclaimed crime thriller Loot which is considered Nepal's biggest blockbuster for exceeding  crore (50 million Nepalese rupees) worldwide . These were broken by action-thriller Kohinoor  (2014), which is considered Nepal's first blockbuster for exceeding  crore (100 million Nepalese rupees) worldwide, and domestically outperforming Indian films. The comedies Chhakka Panja (2016) and Chhakka Panja 3 (2018) has a combined worldwide gross of  crore. In 2022, Kabaddi 4: The Final Match collected more than रु 17.6 Crore in its first eleven days, according to its distributor and producers. and has become highest grossing Nepali film of all time in less than 20 days and becoming all time blockbuster.

Notable examples 

:
 The highest-grossing film in Nepal is Baahubali 2: The Conclusion with gross of  crore 
 The highest-grossing Nepalese film in Nepal is Kabaddi 4: The Final Match with gross of  crore (229 million Nepalese rupees)
The best-performing Nepalese film overseas is Kabaddi 4: The Final Match with gross of  crore (120 million Nepalese rupees)
 The highest-grossing Hollywood film in Nepal is Spider-Man: No Way Home with gross of  crore
 The biggest opening day by a Nepalese movie Kabaddi 4: The Final Match with box-office opening of  crore (30.5 million Nepalese rupees)
 The biggest domestic opening day by a foreign movie is K.G.F: Chapter 2 with box-office opening of  crore (3.01 million Nepalese rupees)

Highest-grossing Nepali films in Nepal

Highest grossing foreign films in Nepal

Highest grossing films in Nepal

Records

Highest Earnings on First Day 
This purely based on the box office reports provided by various online media and distributors of respective films enlisted.

.

Highest collection on first day by year

.

Highest grossing film by year

.

Highest Nepali Records Breakout

.

Highest Nepali Cinema Records

.

Highest grossing film by month

.

Highest grossing franchise and film series

.

See also
 List of Nepalese films
 Lists of highest-grossing films
 List of most expensive Nepali films

Notes

References

Lists of Nepalese films
Nepal